Callionymus is a genus of dragonets found mostly in the Indian and Pacific oceans with a few species occurring in the Atlantic Ocean.

Species
There are currently 110 recognized species in this genus:
 Callionymus aagilis R. Fricke, 1999 (Slow dragonet)
 Callionymus acutirostris R. Fricke, 1981 (Pointed dragonet)
 Callionymus afilum R. Fricke, 2000 (Northern Australian longtail dragonet)
 Callionymus africanus (Kotthaus, 1977) (African deepwater dragonet)
 Callionymus alisae R. Fricke, 2016 (Alis dragonet) 
 Callionymus altipinnis R. Fricke, 1981 (High-fin deepwater dragonet)
 Callionymus amboina Suwardji, 1965 (Ambon darter dragonet)
 Callionymus annulatus M. C. W. Weber, 1913 (Big-head dragonet)
 Callionymus australis R. Fricke, 1983 (Australian dragonet)
 Callionymus bairdi D. S. Jordan, 1888 (Lancer dragonet)
 Callionymus belcheri J. Richardson, 1844 (Belcher's dragonet)
 Callionymus beniteguri D. S. Jordan & Snyder, 1900 (White-spotted dragonet)
 Callionymus bentuviai R. Fricke, 1981 (Ben-Tuvia's deepwater dragonet)
 Callionymus bifilum R. Fricke, 2000 (Northwestern Australian deepwater dragonet)
 Callionymus bleekeri R. Fricke, 1983 (Bleeker's deepwater dragonet)
 Callionymus boucheti R. Fricke, 2017 (Bouchet's dragonet)
 Callionymus brevianalis R. Fricke, 1983 (Small ruddertail dragonet) 
 Callionymus caeruleonotatus C. H. Gilbert, 1905 (Blue-spotted dragonet)
 Callionymus carebares Alcock, 1890 (Indian deepwater dragonet)
 Callionymus colini R. Fricke, 1993 (Tiny New Guinea longtail dragonet)
 Callionymus comptus J. E. Randall, 1999 (Ornamented dragonet)
 Callionymus cooperi Regan, 1908 (Cooper's dragonet)
 Callionymus curvicornis Valenciennes, 1837 (Horn dragonet)
 Callionymus curvispinis R. Fricke & Zaiser, 1993 (Izu ruddertail dragonet)
 Callionymus decoratus (C. H. Gilbert, 1905) (Decorated dragonet)
 Callionymus delicatulus J. L. B. Smith, 1963 (Delicate dragonet)
 Callionymus doryssus (D. S. Jordan & Fowler, 1903) (Japanese filamentous dragonet)
 Callionymus draconis Nakabo, 1977 (Japanese spiny dragonet)
 Callionymus enneactis Bleeker, 1879 (Mangrove dragonet)
 Callionymus erythraeus E. Ninni, 1934 (Small-head dragonet)
 Callionymus fasciatus Valenciennes, 1837 (Banded dragonet)
 Callionymus filamentosus Valenciennes, 1837 (Blotch-fin dragonet)
 Callionymus flavus R. Fricke, 1983 (Yellow ruddertail dragonet)
 Callionymus fluviatilis F. Day, 1876 (River dragonet)
 Callionymus formosanus R. Fricke, 1981 (Taiwanese deepwater dragonet)
 Callionymus futuna R. Fricke, 1998 (Futuna deepwater dragonet)
 Callionymus gardineri Regan, 1908 (Long-tail dragonet)
 Callionymus goodladi (Whitley, 1944) (Goodlad's dragonet)
 Callionymus grossi J. D. Ogilby, 1910 (Gross' dragonet)
 Callionymus guentheri R. Fricke, 1981 (Günther's deepwater dragonet)
 Callionymus hainanensis S. C. Li, 1966 (Hainan darter dragonet)
 Callionymus hildae R. Fricke, 1981 (Hilde's darter dragonet)
 Callionymus hindsii J. Richardson, 1844 (Hinds' dragonet)
 Callionymus ikedai (Nakabo, Senou & Aizawa, 1998) (Ryukyu ruddertail dragonet)
 Callionymus io R. Fricke, 1983 (Andaman Sea spiny dragonet)
 Callionymus izuensis R. Fricke & Zaiser, 1993 (Izu dragonet)
 Callionymus japonicus Houttuyn, 1782 (Japanese longtail dragonet)
 Callionymus kailolae R. Fricke, 2000 (Kailola's deepwater dragonet)
 Callionymus kanakorum R. Fricke, 2006 (Kanakorum dragonet)
 Callionymus keeleyi Fowler, 1941 (Keeley's dragonet)
 Callionymus koreanus (Nakabo, S. R. Jeon & S. C. Li, 1987) (Korean dragonet)
 Callionymus kotthausi R. Fricke, 1981 (Kotthaus’ deepwater dragonet)
 Callionymus leucobranchialis Fowler, 1941 (White-gill dragonet)
 Callionymus leucopoecilus R. Fricke & C. L. Lee, 1993 (Korean darter dragonet)
 Callionymus limiceps J. D. Ogilby, 1908 (Rough-headed dragonet)
 Callionymus lunatus Temminck & Schlegel, 1845 (Moon dragonet)
 Callionymus luridus R. Fricke, 1981 (Macclesfield longtail dragonet)
 Callionymus lyra Linnaeus, 1758 (Dragonet)
 Callionymus macclesfieldensis R. Fricke, 1983 (Macclesfield dragonet)
 Callionymus macdonaldi J. D. Ogilby, 1911 (Australian darter dragonet)
 Callionymus maculatus Rafinesque, 1810 (Spotted dragonet)
 Callionymus madangensis R. Fricke, 2014 (Madang dragonet) 
 Callionymus margaretae Regan, 1905 (Margaret's dragonet)
 Callionymus marleyi Regan, 1919 (Sand dragonet)
 Callionymus marquesensis R. Fricke, 1989 (Marquesas ruddertail dragonet)
 Callionymus martinae R. Fricke, 1981 (Martina's dragonet)
 Callionymus mascarenus R. Fricke, 1983 (Mauritius dragonet)
 Callionymus megastomus R. Fricke, 1982 (Indian megamouth dragonet)
 Callionymus melanotopterus Bleeker, 1850 (Indonesian flag dragonet)
 Callionymus meridionalis Suwardji, 1965 (White-flag dragonet)
 Callionymus moretonensis C. R. Johnson, 1971 (Queensland dragonet)
 Callionymus mortenseni Suwardji, 1965 (Mortensen's darter dragonet)
 Callionymus muscatensis Regan, 1905 (Muscat dragonet)
 Callionymus neptunius (Seale, 1910) (Long-tail dragonet)
 Callionymus obscurus R. Fricke, 1989 (Obscure dragonet)
 Callionymus ochiaii R. Fricke, 1981 (Japanese lowfin deepwater dragonet)
 Callionymus octostigmatus R. Fricke, 1981 (Eight-spot dragonet)
 Callionymus ogilbyi R. Fricke, 2002 (Eastern Australian longtail dragonet)
 Callionymus omanensis R. Fricke, Jawad & Al-Mamry, 2014 (Oman dragonet)  
 Callionymus oxycephalus R. Fricke, 1980 (Red Sea spiny dragonet)
 Callionymus persicus Regan, 1905 (Persian dragonet)
 Callionymus petersi R. Fricke, 2016 (Peters's dragonet) 
 Callionymus planus Ochiai, 1955 (Japanese darter dragonet)
 Callionymus platycephalus R. Fricke, 1983 (Flat-head dragonet)
 Callionymus pleurostictus R. Fricke, 1982 (Blue-spotted ruddertail dragonet)
 Callionymus profundus R. Fricke & Golani, 2013 
 Callionymus pusillus Delaroche, 1809 (Sail-fin dragonet)
 Callionymus regani Nakabo, 1979 (Regan's deepwater dragonet)
 Callionymus reticulatus Valenciennes, 1837 (Reticulated dragonet)
 Callionymus risso Lesueur, 1814 (Risso's dragonet)
 Callionymus rivatoni R. Fricke, 1993 (New Caledonian longtail dragonet)
 Callionymus russelli C. R. Johnson, 1976 (Russell's dragonet)
 Callionymus sagitta Pallas, 1770 (Arrow dragonet)
 Callionymus scaber McCulloch, 1926 (Lord Howe longtail dragonet)
 Callionymus scabriceps Fowler, 1941 (Jolo dragonet)
 Callionymus schaapii Bleeker, 1852 (Short-snout sand dragonet)
 Callionymus semeiophor R. Fricke, 1983 (Nusa Tenggara deepwater dragonet)
 Callionymus sereti R. Fricke, 1998 (Séret's dragonet)
 Callionymus simplicicornis Valenciennes, 1837 (Simple-spined dragonet)
 Callionymus sokonumeri Kamohara, 1936 (Japanese highfin deepwater dragonet) 
 Callionymus sphinx R. Fricke & Heckele, 1984 (Sphinx dragonet)
 Callionymus stigmatopareius R. Fricke, 1981 (Mozambique dragonet)
 Callionymus sublaevis McCulloch, 1926 (Australian filamentous dragonet)
 Callionymus superbus R. Fricke, 1983 (Proud dragonet)
 Callionymus tenuis R. Fricke, 1981 (Tiny dragonet)
 Callionymus tethys R. Fricke, 1993 (Tethys dragonet)
 Callionymus umbrithorax Fowler, 1941 (Philippine darkthroat dragonet)
 Callionymus valenciennei Temminck & Schlegel, 1845 (Valenciennes’ dragonet)
 Callionymus whiteheadi R. Fricke, 1981 (Whitehead's deepwater dragonet)
 Callionymus zythros R. Fricke, 2000 (Wongat dragonet)
 Callionymus vyali Carolin, Bajpai, Maurya & Schwarzhans, 2022 (otolith based fossil species, Burdigalian)
 means extinct

References

 
Taxa named by Carl Linnaeus
Marine fish genera
Ray-finned fish genera
Taxonomy articles created by Polbot